Hayrullah Mert Akyüz (born 2 October 1993) is a Turkish professional footballer who plays for 24 Erzincanspor.

Career

Early years
Intended to be a midfielder originally, while playing as a midfielder at his first school's football team, Akyüz considered to be a goalkeeper by recommendation of his father, who had been playing also as goalie in his childhood. He started to play football in 2002.

Club career
Akyüz made his TFF First League debut on 19 December 2014, against Osmanlıspor, which ended 1–1 at Adana 5 Ocak Stadium. Akyüz renewed his contract with Adanaspor on 23 June 2015. Akyüz is linked with Galatasaray in July 2015.

International career
Akyüz was selected for Turkey A2 team squad for 2013-15 International Challenge Trophy game against Italy on 23 March 2015. He played the game against Italy, ended 5–3 for Turkey A2, after penally-shootouts in which Akyüz saved two penalties.

Akyüz was called up for Turkish national football team for senior level by manager Fatih Terim, for the UEFA Euro 2016 qualifying stage Group A encounter against Czech Republic, on 10 October 2015. On 10 November 2015, Akyüz is called up for Turkey again for friendly games against Qatar and Greece.

Playing style
Based on his 2015 training regime, Akyüz trains different disciplines, including swimming, and skipping.

References

External links
 

1993 births
People from Aksaray Province
Living people
Turkish footballers
Turkey youth international footballers
Association football goalkeepers
Adanaspor footballers
Tuzlaspor players
24 Erzincanspor footballers
Süper Lig players
TFF First League players
TFF Second League players
TFF Third League players